Mel Kenealy (17 May 1903 Denver, Colorado – 29 June 1985 Long Beach, California) was an American racecar driver. Kenealy was one of the top drivers on the AAA Pacific Southwest circuit during the late 1920s-early 1930s. He made five career AAA Championship starts, all in the 1930 season.

Indy 500 results

References

1903 births
1985 deaths
Indianapolis 500 drivers
Racing drivers from Denver